The 1992 All-Ireland Senior Hurling Championship Final was the 105th All-Ireland Final and the culmination of the 1992 All-Ireland Senior Hurling Championship, an inter-county hurling tournament for the top teams in Ireland. The match was held at Croke Park, Dublin, on 6 September 1992, between Kilkenny and Cork. The Munster champions lost to their Leinster opponents on a score line of 3-10 to 1-12.

Match details

All-Ireland Senior Hurling Championship Final
All-Ireland Senior Hurling Championship Final, 1992
All-Ireland Senior Hurling Championship Final
All-Ireland Senior Hurling Championship Finals
Cork county hurling team matches
Kilkenny GAA matches